Hide Your Heart is a song by Welsh singer Bonnie Tyler, released on her 1988 album Hide Your Heart. The song was written by Kiss' rhythm guitarist and vocalist Paul Stanley, Desmond Child and Holly Knight. Although the song failed to chart (except in Finland), it has appeared on several compilations.

Background
"Hide Your Heart" was originally rejected for Kiss' 1987 album Crazy Nights.  Stanley offered the song to other artists, with Bonnie Tyler recording it first for her 1988 album Hide Your Heart. In 1989, covers of the song later appeared on three different albums: Robin Beck's Trouble or Nothin', Kiss's Hot in the Shade, and Ace Frehley's Trouble Walkin'.

Bonnie Tyler version

Charts

"Hide Your Heart" appears on following Bonnie Tyler albums:
Hide Your Heart
The Very Best of Bonnie Tyler
The Best (French version)
Power & Passion – The Very Best Of Bonnie Tyler
Total Eclipse Anthology
Ravishing: The Best of Bonnie Tyler
Holding Out for a Hero – The Very Best Of Bonnie Tyler
Best Of 3 CD
 Bonnie Tyler: The Collection
All the Hits

Kiss version

Kiss' version of "Hide Your Heart" is the third of four versions released in 1989. The first version was by Molly Hatchet on their album Lightning Strikes Twice, released on September 6. The second version was by former Kiss guitarist Ace Frehley, featured on his fourth studio album Trouble Walkin' which was released only four days before Kiss' Hot in the Shade. The last version of the song was by Robin Beck, released on November 9 on her album Trouble Or Nothin'''. A music video was filmed on top of the Hotel Royale in Los Angeles. The song wasn't a big success on radio, charting its highest number 59 in the United Kingdom and reaching number 22 on the U.S. album rock charts. It was however a very popular music video on MTV. Paul Stanley performed the song during his 2006 solo tour in support of his album Live to Win and appears on his live album/DVD One Live Kiss. It was also played live during the band's 40th anniversary tour and "End of the Road" tour.

Kiss personnel
Paul Stanley – rhythm guitar, lead and backing vocals, 
Gene Simmons – bass guitar, backing vocals
Eric Carr – drums, percussion, backing vocals 
Bruce Kulick – lead and additional guitar
Phil Ashley – keyboards, backing vocals

Appearances
"Hide Your Heart" appears on following Kiss albums:Hot in the ShadeThe Best of Kiss, Volume 2: The Millennium CollectionThe Box SetCharts

Ace Frehley version
Personnel
 Ace Frehley – lead guitar, lead vocals
 Richie Scarlet – rhythm guitar, backing vocals
 John Regan – bass guitar, synthesizer
 Anton Fig – drums
 Peter Criss – percussion, backing vocals
 Peppi Castro – backing vocals

Other versions
Molly Hatchet – Lightning Strikes TwiceRobin Beck – Trouble or Nothin'''

References

1988 singles
1989 singles
Bonnie Tyler songs
Kiss (band) songs
Songs written by Desmond Child
Songs written by Paul Stanley
Songs written by Holly Knight
Music videos directed by Marty Callner
Song recordings produced by Desmond Child
Columbia Records singles
1987 songs